The National Front Party (MCP) is the registered political party in Azerbaijan established by Razi Nurullayev and on August 31, 2020.

History 
On August 19, 2015, forces dissatisfied with Ali Karimli announced the formation of the AXCP Confidence Congress Organizing Committee (AXCP EQTK), a former deputy chairman of the APFP, Razi Nurullayev. After being elected chairman, the APFP ECRC did not recognize this congress and elections, held a congress on October 17, 2015 and elected Razi Nurullayev chairman of the APFP.

Razi Nurullayev resigned on behalf of the Popular Front Party at the party's congress on July 29, 2020 and founded a new National Front Party.

The party was registered on September 1, 2020.

Symbolics 
The elements used in the logo are the moon, the star and the exinasea flower. The crescent reflected in the logo is a symbol of the Turkic peoples.

As for the meaning of the octagonal star, it shows the spelling of the word "Azerbaijan" in the old alphabet and the commitment of all peoples living in Azerbaijan to the ideology of equality and Azerbaijanism. 

The blue color used in the logo is associated with the idea of Pan-Turkism. Red represents the building of a modern society and democratic development.

References 

Political parties established in 2020
Political parties in Azerbaijan
Azerbaijani democracy movements